Abdur Raquib Khandaker was the Inspector General of Bangladesh Police.

Early life 
Khandaker graduated from Notre Dame College, Dhaka. He studied economics at the University of Dhaka and briefly taught at Notre Dame College, Dhaka.

Career 
Khandaker joined the Police Service of Pakistan in 1956.

Khandaker served as the Superintendent of Police in Khulna District in 1971 during the Bangladesh Liberation War.

In 1974, Khandaker sustain an injury from an accident while on duty which affected him for the rest of his life. From 1976 to 1986, Khandaker served as the president of Bangladesh Football Federation. In 1976, he was the Deputy Inspector General of Police stationed in the police headquarters in Dhaka. He served as the Deputy Inspector General of Rajshahi Police range.

Khandaker was the third commissioner of the Dhaka Metropolitan Police. He served from 2 February 1979 to 8 February 1982.

Khandaker was stationed in the Permanent mission of Bangladesh to the United Nations and was elected to the United Nations Economic and Social Council in 1984. He served in the Crime Prevention and Control Committee of the United Nations.

Khandaker served as the Inspector General of Bangladesh Police from 31 December 1985 to 28 February 1990. He served under military dictator Hussain Mohammad Ershad.

In 1999, Khandaker was awarded the National Sports Awards. Khandakar wrote Society Politics & Civil Order: Memoirs of the Police Chief of Bangladesh on 1 January 2002. He wrote about experiences as a Bengali officer in the Pakistan establishment and later working in independent Bangladesh. He wrote for The Daily Star.

Death 
Khandaker died on 25 August 2010.

References 

Inspectors General of Police (Bangladesh)
2010 deaths
Bangladeshi police officers
University of Dhaka alumni
Notre Dame College, Dhaka alumni
Academic staff of Notre Dame College, Dhaka